DOK (for documentary) is the title of a show on German-speaking Swiss public channel SRF 1.

Background and contents 
Started in 1990, DOK usually is broadcast on Wednesday, Thursday and partially on Sunday from 20:05 to 20:50 on SRF 1 and repeated on SRF info. The documentary television series focusses on personalities, social life, actualities, but also historical issues, among others the Wauwilermoos internment camp during World War II. DOK claims to maintain the long form [news], the second look behind the news topicality, stories, as unique as the life, first hand recounted. The team therefore produces in-house content, but also serial documentaries, for instance on Swiss migrants to other countries, but also DOK broadcasts productions of other television channels.

DOK am Mittwoch (literally "DOK on Wednesday") presents international documentaries on current themes: enthralling stories about human coexistence, and about politically relevant issues. Stories about movies from the free Swiss filmmaking complement the range. DOK am Donnerstag shows on Thursday challenging productions from Switzerland and outstanding international documentaries related to society, economy, politics, nature, adventure and contemporary history.

On Sunday, DOK focusses on exciting stories, moving stories, well-researched reports with enchanting beautiful animal and landscape paintings. The documentaries have a wide range of topics - ranging from historical topics to nature, science, discovery, archeology and adventure to society and politics, suitable for families and to deepen the knowledge of the viewers.

References

External links 
  

Swiss documentary television series
1990s Swiss television series
2000s Swiss television series
2010s Swiss television series
2020s Swiss television series
1990 Swiss television series debuts
German-language television shows
1990s documentary television series
2000s documentary television series
2010s documentary television series
2020s documentary television series
Schweizer Radio und Fernsehen original programming